Neopsittacus is a genus of parrot in the family Psittaculidae. The genus contains two species, both of which are native to New Guinea.

Taxonomy
The genus Neopsittacus contains two species and several subspecies:

Neopsittacus Salvadori 1875

Neopsittacus musschenbroekii (Schlegel 1871) (yellow-billed lorikeet)
 Neopsittacus musschenbroekii major Neumann 1924
 Neopsittacus musschenbroekii musschenbroekii (Schlegel 1871)
Neopsittacus pullicauda Hartert 1896 (orange-billed lorikeet)
 Neopsittacus pullicauda alpinus Ogilvie-Grant 1914
 Neopsittacus pullicauda pullicauda Hartert 1896
 Neopsittacus pullicauda socialis Mayr 1931

References

 
 
 
Taxonomy articles created by Polbot